3-Methylamphetamine (3-MeA; PAL-314) is a stimulant drug from the amphetamine family. It is self-administered by mice to a similar extent to 4-fluoroamphetamine and has comparable properties as a monoamine releaser, although with a more balanced release of all three monoamines, as opposed to the more dopamine/noradrenaline selective fluoro analogues.

See also 
 2-Methylamphetamine
 3-Methylmethamphetamine
 4-Methylamphetamine
 3,4-Dimethylamphetamine
 3-Trifluoromethylamphetamine

References 

Substituted amphetamines
Serotonin-norepinephrine-dopamine releasing agents